Champagne & Grits is the fourth album by Little Axe, released on September 21, 2004 by Real World Records and Virgin Records.

Track listing

Personnel 

Musicians
Clubfoot – guitar (7)
Chris Difford – vocals (9)
Bernard Fowler – vocals (1, 10, 11)
Dave Foster – harmonica (3)
Ghetto Priest – vocals (3, 13)
Alan Glen – harmonica (2, 6, 11)
Dorie Jackson – backing vocals (9)
Junior Delgado – vocals (6, 13)
Keith LeBlanc – drums (1-3, 5, 6, 11)
Skip McDonald – vocals, guitar, producer
Shara Nelson – vocals (7)
Bernard O'Neill –  double bass (13)
Prithpal Rajput – tabla (5, 10)
Denise Sherwood – backing vocals (9)
Doug Wimbish – bass guitar (1-3, 5, 6, 9)

Technical personnel
Nick Coplowe – programming, engineering
Adrian Sherwood – producer, mixing
Chris Weinland – programming, engineering

Release history

References

External links 
 

2004 albums
Albums produced by Adrian Sherwood
Little Axe albums